Gmina Kłodawa may refer to either of the following administrative districts in Poland:
Gmina Kłodawa, Lubusz Voivodeship
Gmina Kłodawa, Greater Poland Voivodeship